Prevas is a technical IT company that offers services and products to customers who are developing products with high IT content or who need to streamline or automate their operations. Prevas was founded in 1985 and has a business focus in product development, embedded systems, industrial IT, and automation, certified according to the quality standard ISO 9001.

Prevas is a supplier and development partner for companies in industries such as life science, telecom, automotive, defense, energy and engineering. Offices are located in Sweden, Denmark, Norway and India. The company has 527 employees. Prevas has been listed on the NASDAQ exchange in Stockholm since 1998.

Prevas has won first prize in the :sv:Swedish Embedded Award in the Enterprise category four times. With a communications system in 2009, along with Interspiro, that are used in extreme situations and rescue operations. An analyzer for liquids, such as cow, buffalo and breast milk, together with the Miris Holding, in 2012. An mHealth product that is a wireless breathalyzer device and provides entirely new capabilities for helping alcoholics during critical periods after leaving rehab centers, together with Kontigo Care in 2014.

And finally a wireless training manikins that takes CPR (cardio pulmonary resuscitation) training to a next level, together with Ambu. The use of training manikins is a key to save lives. Many of the products are examples of how the Internet of Things application can benefit society and save lives.

Selected Products

Prevas Industrial Linux 

An off-the-shelf embedded Linux platform for Industrial use on customized hardware boards, with support for full customization and longevity maintenance. Prevas Industrial Linux is provided with the OE-lite Linux or Yocto Project integration tools.

Open Source project involvements 

These projects are contributed to Prevas.

References 

Information technology companies of Sweden
Linux companies
Embedded Linux
1985 establishments in Sweden
Companies established in 1985
Companies listed on Nasdaq Stockholm
Consulting firms of Sweden
Companies based in Västmanland County

sv